Marcus Weissmann-Chajes (January 17, 1831 – April 30, 1914) also known by the Hebrew acronym MV"Ḥ, was a Galician Jewish writer.

Biography
Marcus Weissmann-Chajes was born in Tarnów in 1830, the son of Yitzḥak Leib. He was destined for a rabbinical career, and began at a young age to receive instruction in the Talmud and in rabbinics. Among his tutors were Israel Katz Rapoport, then av beit din of Tarnów. When only ten years of age he began writing Hebrew poetry, and five years later he wrote his Mappalat ha-mitkashsherim, a metrical composition on the failure of the Polish revolt. Part of this work appeared in the Maggid Mishneh (1872) under the title Aḥarit mered.

In 1872 he founded in Lemberg the Maggid Mishneh, a semimonthly periodical devoted to Jewish history and to Hebrew literature; of this publication, however, only four numbers appeared. During the years 1874 to 1876 he edited the Wiener Jüdische Zeitung, a Yiddish weekly.

Publications
  An alphabetically arranged collection of Talmudic proverbs rendered into metrical rimes.
  Index and glosses to the Jerusalem Talmud, appended to the Krotoschin edition.
 
  Collection of literary-historical, philological and poetic essays promoting study of the Hebrew language.
  Parables and legends rendered into metrical verse.
  The 613 commandments derived by means of notarikon from "bereshit."
  Epigrams and humorous sayings in verse. 
  Polemic against Georg Ritter von Schönerer.
  Second edition of the Mashal u-melitzah, in which the Talmudic proverbs are supplied with rimed explanations.

References
 

1831 births
1914 deaths
Hebrew-language poets
Hebrew-language writers
Jews from Galicia (Eastern Europe)
People from Tarnów
People from the Kingdom of Galicia and Lodomeria
People of the Haskalah
Print editors